Joan Crawford (born Lucille Fay LeSueur; March 23, 190? was an American actress. She started her career as a dancer in traveling theatrical companies before debuting on Broadway. Crawford was signed to a motion picture contract by Metro-Goldwyn-Mayer in 1925. Initially frustrated by the size and quality of her parts, Crawford launched a publicity campaign and built an image as a nationally-known flapper by the end of the 1920s. By the 1930s, Crawford's fame rivaled MGM colleagues Norma Shearer and Greta Garbo. Crawford often played hardworking young women who find romance and financial success. These "rags-to-riches" stories were well received by Depression-era audiences and were popular with women. Crawford became one of Hollywood's most prominent movie stars and one of the highest paid women in the United States, but her films began losing money. By the end of the 1930s, she was labeled "box office poison".

After an absence of nearly two years from the screen, Crawford staged a comeback by starring in Mildred Pierce (1945), for which she won the Academy Award for Best Actress. In 1955, she became involved with the Pepsi-Cola Company, through her marriage to company president Alfred Steele. After his death in 1959, Crawford was elected to fill his vacancy on the board of directors but was forcibly retired in 1973. She continued acting in film and television regularly through the 1960s, when her performances became fewer; after the release of the horror film Trog in 1970, Crawford retired from the screen. Following a public appearance in 1974, after which unflattering photographs were published, Crawford withdrew from public life. She became more and more reclusive until her death in 1977.

Crawford married four times. Her first three marriages ended in divorce; the last ended with the death of husband Al Steele. She adopted five children, one of whom was reclaimed by his birth mother. Crawford's relationships with her two older children, Christina and Christopher, were acrimonious. Crawford disinherited the two and, after Crawford's death, Christina published the "tell-all" memoir Mommie Dearest.

Early life
Born Lucille Fay LeSueur, of French-Huguenot, English, Dutch, and Irish ancestry in San Antonio, Texas, she was the second of the two children of Thomas E. LeSueur (born January 2, 1867, in Tennessee; died January 1, 1938), a construction worker, and Anna Bell Johnson (died August 15, 1958), later known as Anna Cassin. Crawford's mother was likely under 20 when her first two children were born. Crawford had one sister, Daisy, and one brother, Hal LeSueur.

Thomas LeSueur abandoned the family when Lucille was ten months old, eventually resettling in Abilene, Texas, reportedly working in construction. In 1909, while working as a sales associate at Simpson's, Crawford's mother married Henry J. Cassin (1868-1922) in Fort Worth, who is incorrectly listed in the 1910 census as her second husband rather than her third. They lived in Lawton, Oklahoma, where Cassin ran the Ramsey Opera House, booking such diverse and noted performers as Anna Pavlova and Eva Tanguay. As a child, Crawford, who preferred the nickname "Billie", enjoyed watching vaudeville acts perform on the stage of her stepfather's theater. At that time, Crawford was reportedly unaware that Cassin, whom she called "Daddy", was not her biological father; her brother later told her the truth.

From childhood, Crawford's ambition was to be a dancer. One day, in an attempt to escape piano lessons, she leapt from the front porch of her home and cut her foot severely on a broken milk bottle. She had three surgeries to repair the damage, and for 18 months was unable to attend elementary school or continue dancing lessons.

In June 1917, the family moved to Kansas City, Missouri, after Cassin was accused of embezzlement; although acquitted, he was blacklisted in Lawton. After the move, Cassin, a Catholic, placed Crawford at St. Agnes Academy in Kansas City. When her mother and stepfather separated, she remained at school as a work student, where she spent far more time working, primarily cooking and cleaning, than studying. She later attended Rockingham Academy, also as a working student. While there, she began dating, and had her first serious relationship:  a trumpet player, Ray Sterling, who reportedly inspired her to challenge herself academically.

In 1922, she registered at Stephens College in Columbia, Missouri, giving her year of birth as 1906. She attended Stephens for a few months and then withdrew after she realized that she was not ready for college. Due to her family's instability, Crawford's schooling never surpassed the primary level.

Career

Early career

Under the name Lucille LeSueur, Crawford began dancing in the choruses of traveling revues, and was spotted dancing in Detroit by producer Jacob J. Shubert. Shubert put her in the chorus line for his 1924 show, Innocent Eyes, at the Winter Garden Theatre on Broadway in New York City. While appearing in Innocent Eyes, Crawford met a saxophone player named James Welton. The two were allegedly married in 1924, and lived together for several months, although this supposed marriage was never mentioned in later life by Crawford.

Crawford wanted additional work, and approached Loews Theaters publicist Nils Granlund. Granlund secured a position for her with singer Harry Richman's act and arranged for her to do a screen test, which he sent to producer Harry Rapf in Hollywood. Rapf notified Granlund on December 24, 1924, that Metro-Goldwyn-Mayer (MGM) had offered Crawford a contract at $75 a week. Granlund immediately wired LeSueur, who had returned to her mother's home in Kansas City, with the news; she borrowed $400 for travel expenses.

Credited as Lucille LeSueur, her first film was Lady of the Night in 1925, as the body double for Norma Shearer, MGM's most popular female star. She also appeared in The Circle and Pretty Ladies (both 1925), starring comedian ZaSu Pitts. This was soon followed by equally small and unbilled roles in two other 1925 silent films: The Only Thing, and The Merry Widow.

MGM publicity head Pete Smith recognized her ability to become a major star, but felt her name sounded fake; he told studio head Louis B. Mayer that her last name, LeSueur, reminded him of a sewer. Smith organized a contest called "Name the Star" in Movie Weekly to allow readers to select her new stage name. The initial choice was "Joan Arden", but after another actress was found to have prior claim to that name, the alternative surname "Crawford" became the choice. She later said that she wanted her first name to be pronounced Jo-Anne, and that she hated the name Crawford because it sounded like "crawfish", but also admitted she "liked the security" that went with the name.

Self-promotion, and early successes
Growing increasingly frustrated over the size and quality of the parts she was given, Crawford embarked on a campaign of self-promotion. As MGM screenwriter Frederica Sagor Maas recalled, "No one decided to make Joan Crawford a star. Joan Crawford became a star because Joan Crawford decided to become a star." She began attending dances in the afternoons and evenings at hotels around Hollywood and at dance venues on the beach piers, where she often won dance competitions with her performances of the Charleston and the Black Bottom.

Her strategy worked and MGM cast her in the film where she first made an impression on audiences, Edmund Goulding's Sally, Irene and Mary (1925). From the beginning of her career, Crawford considered Norma Shearer – the studio's most-popular actress – her professional nemesis. Shearer was married to MGM Head of Production Irving Thalberg; hence, she had the first choice of scripts, and had more control than other stars in what films she would and would not make. Crawford was quoted to have said: "How can I compete with Norma? She sleeps with the boss!"

Crawford was named one of 1926's WAMPAS Baby Stars, along with Mary Astor, Dolores del Río, Janet Gaynor, and Fay Wray, among others. That same year, she co-starred in Paris with Charles Ray. Within a few years, she became the romantic lead to many of MGM's top male stars, including Ramón Novarro, John Gilbert, William Haines, and Tim McCoy.

Crawford appeared as a skimpily clad young carnival assistant in The Unknown (1927), starring Lon Chaney, Sr. as a carnival knife thrower with no arms who hopes to marry her. She stated that she learned more about acting from watching Chaney work than from anyone else in her career. "It was then", she said, "I became aware for the first time of the difference between standing in front of a camera, and acting." Also in 1927, she appeared alongside her close friend, William Haines, in Spring Fever, which was the first of three movies the duo made together.

In 1928, Crawford starred opposite Ramón Novarro in Across to Singapore, but it was her role as Diana Medford in Our Dancing Daughters (1928) that catapulted her to stardom. The role established her as a symbol of modern 1920s-style femininity who rivaled Clara Bow, the original It girl, and Hollywood's foremost flapper. A stream of hits followed Our Dancing Daughters, including two more flapper-themed movies, in which Crawford embodied for her legion of fans (many of whom were women) an idealized vision of the free-spirited, all-American girl.

F. Scott Fitzgerald wrote of Crawford:

Crawford described her glamorous onscreen persona more succinctly, saying, "If you want to see the girl next door, go next door."

On June 3, 1929, Crawford married Douglas Fairbanks, Jr. at Saint Malachy's Roman Catholic Church (known as "The Actors' Chapel", owing to its proximity to Broadway theatres) in Manhattan, although neither was Catholic. Fairbanks was the son of Douglas Fairbanks and the stepson of Mary Pickford, who were considered Hollywood royalty. Fairbanks Sr. and Pickford were opposed to the marriage, and did not invite the couple to their home at Pickfair for eight months after the marriage.

The relationship between Crawford and Fairbanks, Sr., eventually warmed; she called him Uncle Doug, and he called her Billie, her childhood nickname, but one that close friends used throughout her life. She and Pickford, however, continued to despise each other. Following that first invitation, Crawford and Fairbanks, Jr., became more frequent guests. While the Fairbanks men played golf together, Crawford was either left with Pickford, who would retire to her quarters, or simply left alone.

To rid herself of her Southwestern accent, Crawford tirelessly practiced diction and elocution. She said:

Transition to sound, and continued success
After the release of The Jazz Singer in 1927—the first feature-length film with some audible dialogue—sound films became all the rage. The transition from silent to sound caused panic for many, if not all, involved with the film industry; many silent film stars found themselves unemployable because of their undesirable voices and hard-to-understand accents, or simply because of their refusal to make the transition to talkies.

Many studios and stars avoided making the transition as long as possible, especially MGM, which was the last of the major studios to switch over to sound. The Hollywood Revue of 1929 was one of the studio's first all-talking films, and their first attempt to showcase their stars' ability to make the transition from silent to sound. Crawford was among the dozen or more MGM stars included in the movie; she sang the song "Got a Feeling for You" during the film's first act. She studied singing with Estelle Liebling, the voice teacher of Beverly Sills, in the 1920s and 1930s.

Crawford made a successful transition to talkies with her first starring role in the all-talking feature-length film Untamed (1929), co-starring Robert Montgomery. Despite the success of the film at the box office, it received mixed reviews from critics, who noted that while Crawford seemed nervous at making the transition to sound, she had become one of the most popular actresses in the world. Montana Moon (1930), an uneasy mix of Western clichés and music, teamed her with John Mack Brown and Ricardo Cortez. Although the film had problems with censors, it was a major success at the time of its release. Our Blushing Brides (1930), the final installment in the Our Dancing Daughters franchise co-starring Robert Armstrong and Anita Page, where Crawford "carries the burden of dramatics in this photoplay and comes off splendidly and intelligently." Her next movie, Paid (1930), paired her with Robert Armstrong, and was another success. During the early sound era, MGM began to place Crawford in more sophisticated roles, rather than continuing to promote her flapper-inspired persona of the silent era.
In 1931, MGM cast Crawford in five films. Three of them teamed her opposite Clark Gable, the studio's soon-to-be biggest male star and "King of Hollywood". Dance, Fools, Dance, released in February 1931, was the first pairing of Crawford and Gable. Their second movie together, Laughing Sinners, released in May 1931, was directed by Harry Beaumont and also co-starred Neil Hamilton.  Possessed, their third film together, released in October, was directed by Clarence Brown. These films were immensely popular with audiences and were generally well received by critics, establishing Crawford's position as one of MGM's top female stars of the decade along with Norma Shearer, Greta Garbo and Jean Harlow. Her only other notable film of 1931, This Modern Age, was released in August and despite unfavorable reviews was a moderate success.

MGM next cast her in the film Grand Hotel, directed by Edmund Goulding. As the studio's first all-star production, Crawford co-starred opposite Greta Garbo, John and Lionel Barrymore, and Wallace Beery, among others. Receiving third billing, she played the middle-class stenographer to Beery's controlling general director. Crawford later admitted to being nervous during the filming of the movie because she was working with accomplished actors, and that she was disappointed that she had no scenes with one she had admired, the "divine Garbo". Grand Hotel was released in April 1932 to critical and commercial success. It was one of the highest-grossing movies of the year, and won the Academy Award for Best Picture.

Crawford achieved continued success in Letty Lynton (1932). Soon after this movie's release, a plagiarism suit forced MGM to withdraw it; it is therefore considered the "lost" Crawford film. Designed by Adrian, the gown with large ruffled sleeves which Crawford wore in the movie became a popular style that same year, and was even copied by Macy's. On loan to United Artists, she played prostitute Sadie Thompson in Rain (1932), a film version of John Colton's 1923 play. Actress Jeanne Eagels played the role on stage, and Gloria Swanson had originated the part on screen in the 1928 film version. Crawford's performance was panned, and the film was not a success. Despite the failure of Rain, in 1932, the publishing of the first "Top Ten Money-Making Stars Poll" placed Crawford third in popularity at the box office, behind only Marie Dressler and Janet Gaynor. She remained on the list for the next several years, last appearing on it in 1936. In May 1933, Crawford divorced Fairbanks, citing "grievous mental cruelty". Crawford claimed Fairbanks had "a jealous and suspicious attitude" toward her friends, and that they had "loud arguments about the most trivial subjects" lasting "far into the night".

Following her divorce, she was again teamed with Clark Gable, along with Franchot Tone and Fred Astaire, in the hit Dancing Lady (1933), in which she received top billing. She next played the title role in Sadie McKee (1934), opposite Tone and Gene Raymond. She was paired with Gable for the fifth time in Chained (1934), and for the sixth time in Forsaking All Others (1934). Crawford's films of this era were some of the most-popular and highest-grossing films of the mid-1930s.

In 1935, Crawford married Franchot Tone, a stage actor from New York who planned to use his film earnings to finance his theatre group. The couple built a small theatre at Crawford's Brentwood home, and put on productions of classic plays for select groups of friends who lived in the popular Brentwood area like Clark Gable and Charley Chase. Tone and Crawford had first appeared together in Today We Live (1933), but Crawford was hesitant about entering into another romance so soon after her split from Fairbanks.

Before and during their marriage, Crawford worked to promote Tone's Hollywood career, but he was not interested in being a star, ultimately wanting to just be an actor, and Crawford wearied of the effort. During their marriage they tried on two separate occasions for children, both ending in miscarriage. Tone allegedly began drinking and became physically abusive. She filed for divorce, which was granted in 1939. Crawford and Tone later rekindled their friendship, and Tone even proposed in 1964 that they remarry. When he died in 1968, Crawford arranged for him to be cremated and his ashes scattered at Muskoka Lakes, Canada.

Crawford continued her reign as a popular movie actress well into the mid-1930s. No More Ladies (1935) co-starred Robert Montgomery and then-husband Franchot Tone, and was a success. Crawford had long pleaded with MGM's head Louis B. Mayer to cast her in more dramatic roles, and although he was reluctant, he cast her in the sophisticated comedy-drama I Live My Life (1935), directed by W. S. Van Dyke, and it was well received by critics.

She next starred in The Gorgeous Hussy (1936), opposite Robert Taylor and Lionel Barrymore, as well as Tone. It was a critical and box-office success, and became one of Crawford's biggest hits of the decade. Love on the Run (1936), a romantic comedy directed by W. S. Van Dyke, was her seventh film co-starring Clark Gable.

"Box office poison"

Even though Crawford remained a respected MGM actress, and her films still earned profits, her popularity declined in the late 1930s. In 1937, Crawford was proclaimed the first "Queen of the Movies" by Life magazine. She unexpectedly slipped from seventh to sixteenth place at the box office that year, and her public popularity also began to wane. Richard Boleslawski's comedy-drama The Last of Mrs. Cheyney (1937) teamed her opposite William Powell in their sole screen pairing. The film was also Crawford's last box-office success before the onset of her "box office poison" period.

She co-starred opposite Franchot Tone for the seventh—and final—time in The Bride Wore Red (1937). The film was generally unfavorably reviewed by the majority of critics. It also ran a financial loss, becoming one of MGM's biggest failures of the year. Mannequin, co-starring Spencer Tracy, also released in 1937 did, as the New York Times stated, "restore Crawford to her throne as queen of the working girls".

On May 3, 1938, Crawford—along with Greta Garbo, Norma Shearer, Luise Rainer, John Barrymore, Katharine Hepburn, Fred Astaire, Dolores del Río, and others—was dubbed "Box Office Poison" in an open letter in the Independent Film Journal. The list was submitted by Harry Brandt, president of the Independent Theatre Owners Association of America. Brandt stated that while these stars had "unquestioned" dramatic abilities, their high salaries did not reflect in their ticket sales, thus hurting the movie exhibitors involved. Crawford's follow-up movie, Frank Borzage's The Shining Hour (1938), also starring Margaret Sullavan and Melvyn Douglas, was well received by critics, but it was a box-office flop.

She made a comeback in 1939 with her role as home-wrecker Crystal Allen in The Women, opposite her professional nemesis, Norma Shearer. A year later, she played against type in the unglamorous role of Julie in Strange Cargo (1940), her eighth—and final—film with Clark Gable. She later starred as a facially disfigured blackmailer in A Woman's Face (1941), a remake of the Swedish film En kvinnas ansikte which had starred Ingrid Bergman in the lead role three years earlier. While the film was only a moderate box office success, Crawford's performance was hailed by many critics.

Crawford adopted her first child, a daughter, in 1940. Because she was single, California law prevented her from adopting within the state; so, she arranged the adoption through an agency in Las Vegas. The child was temporarily called Joan, until Crawford changed her name to Christina. Crawford married actor Phillip Terry on July 21, 1942, after a six-month courtship. Together, the couple adopted a son whom they named Christopher, but his birth mother reclaimed the child. The couple adopted another boy, whom they named Phillip Terry Jr. After the marriage ended in 1946, Crawford changed that child's name to Christopher Crawford.

After 18 years, Crawford's contract with MGM was terminated by mutual consent on June 29, 1943. In lieu of the last film remaining under her contract, MGM bought her out for $100,000.

Move to Warner Bros.
For $500,000, Crawford signed with Warner Bros. for a three-movie deal, and was placed on the payroll on July 1, 1943. Her first film for the studio was Hollywood Canteen (1944), an all-star morale-booster film that teamed her with several other top movie stars at the time. Crawford said one of the main reasons she signed with Warner Bros. was because she wanted to play the character "Mattie" in a proposed 1944 film version of Edith Wharton's novel Ethan Frome (1911).

She wanted to play the title role in Mildred Pierce (1945), but Bette Davis was the studio's first choice. However, Davis turned the role down. Director Michael Curtiz did not want Crawford to play the part, and he instead lobbied for the casting of Barbara Stanwyck. Warner Bros. defied Curtiz and cast Crawford in the film. Throughout the entire production of the movie, Curtiz criticized Crawford. "She comes over here with her high-hat airs and her goddamn shoulder pads... Why should I waste my time directing a has-been?" Curtiz demanded Crawford prove her suitability by taking a screen test; she agreed. After the test, Curtiz agreed to Crawford's casting. Costume fittings started filming off roughly when Curtiz suspected Crawford of wearing shoulder pads and he proceeded to tear the top of her dress. She said "Thankfully I was wearing a bra." Mildred Pierce was a resounding critical and commercial success. It epitomized the lush visual style and the hard-boiled film noir sensibility that defined Warner Bros. movies of the late forties. Crawford earned the Academy Award for Best Actress in a Leading Role.

The success of Mildred Pierce revived Crawford's movie career. For several years, she starred in what were called "a series of first-rate melodramas". Her next film was Humoresque (1946), co-starring John Garfield, a romantic drama about a love affair between an older woman and a younger man. She starred alongside Van Heflin in Possessed (1947), for which she received a second Academy Award nomination. In Daisy Kenyon (1947), she appeared opposite Dana Andrews and Henry Fonda, and in Flamingo Road (1949), her character has an ultimately deadly feud with a corrupt southern sheriff played by Sydney Greenstreet. She made a cameo in It's a Great Feeling (1949), poking fun at her own screen image. In 1950, she starred in the film noir The Damned Don't Cry and in the melodrama Harriet Craig.

In 1947, Crawford adopted two more children, whom she named Cindy and Cathy. The children were adopted from Tennessee Children's Home Society, an orphanage/child-trafficking unit operated by Georgia Tann, a source used by many childless Hollywood stars to adopt until Tann's discovery and death erupted in infamy in 1952.

After the completion of This Woman Is Dangerous (1952), a film Crawford called her "worst", she asked to be released from her Warner Bros. contract. By this time, she felt Warners was losing interest in her due to "feeble scripts, poor leading men and inept cameramen", so she decided it was time to move on. Later the same year, she received her third—and final—Academy Award nomination for Sudden Fear for RKO Radio Pictures.

Radio and television
Crawford worked in the radio series The Screen Guild Theater on January 8, 1939; Good News; Baby, broadcast on March 2, 1940, on Arch Oboler's Lights Out; The Word on Everyman's Theater (1941); Chained on the Lux Radio Theater, and Norman Corwin's Document A/777 (1948). She appeared in episodes of anthology television series in the 1950s, and, in 1959, made a pilot for The Joan Crawford Show.

Al Steele and Pepsi-Cola Company
Crawford married her fourth—and final—husband, Alfred Steele, at the Flamingo Hotel in Las Vegas on May 10, 1955. Crawford and Steele met at a party in 1954. By that time, Steele had become president of Pepsi-Cola. He later was named chairman of the board and CEO of Pepsi-Cola. Crawford traveled extensively on behalf of Pepsi following the marriage. In 1966, she estimated that she traveled over 100,000 miles a year for the company. Steele died of a heart attack in April 1959. After Steele's death, Crawford was elected to the board of directors.

Crawford received the sixth annual "Pally Award", which was in the shape of a bronze Pepsi bottle. It was awarded to the employee making the most significant contribution to company sales. In 1973, Crawford retired from Pepsi upon her official age of 65.

Later career

After her Academy Award-nominated performance in 1952's Sudden Fear, Crawford continued to work steadily throughout the rest of the decade. After a 10-year absence from MGM, she returned to that studio to star in Torch Song (1953), a musical drama centering on the life of a demanding stage star who falls in love with a blind pianist, played by Michael Wilding. Although the film was highly publicized as Crawford's major comeback, it was a critical and financial failure, known today for its camp appeal. In 1954, she starred in Johnny Guitar, a cult classic directed by Nicholas Ray, co-starring Sterling Hayden and Mercedes McCambridge. She also starred in Female on the Beach (1955) with Jeff Chandler, and in Queen Bee (1955), alongside John Ireland. The following year, she starred opposite a young Cliff Robertson in Autumn Leaves (1956), and filmed a leading role in The Story of Esther Costello (1957), co-starring Rossano Brazzi. Crawford, who had been left near-penniless following Alfred Steele's death, accepted a small role in The Best of Everything (1959). Although she was not the star of the film, she received positive reviews. Crawford later named the role as being one of her personal favorites. By 1961, Joan Crawford was once again her own publicity machine, with a new script, Whatever Happened to Baby Jane?, sent by Robert Aldrich.

Crawford starred as Blanche Hudson, an elderly, disabled former A-list movie star who lives in fear of her psychotic sister Jane, in the highly successful psychological thriller What Ever Happened to Baby Jane? (1962). Despite the actresses' earlier tensions, Crawford reportedly suggested Bette Davis for the role of Jane. The two stars maintained publicly that there was no feud between them. The director, Aldrich, fueling publicity rumors, explained that Davis and Crawford were each aware of how important the film was to their respective careers, and commented, "It's proper to say that they really detested each other, but they behaved absolutely perfectly."

After filming was completed, their public comments against each other propelled their animosity into a life-long feud. The film was a huge success, recouping its costs within eleven days of its nationwide release and reviving Davis and Crawford's careers. Davis was nominated for an Academy Award for her performance as Jane Hudson. Crawford contacted each of the other Oscar nominees in the category (Katharine Hepburn, Lee Remick, Geraldine Page, and Anne Bancroft, all East Coast-based actresses), to let them know that if they could not attend the ceremony, she would be happy to accept the Oscar on their behalf; all agreed. Both Davis and Crawford were backstage – Crawford having presented best director – when the absent Anne Bancroft was announced as the winner and Crawford accepted the award on her behalf. Davis claimed for the rest of her life that Crawford had campaigned against her, a charge Crawford denied.

That same year, Crawford starred as Lucy Harbin in William Castle's horror mystery Strait-Jacket (1964). Aldrich cast Crawford and Davis in Hush...Hush, Sweet Charlotte (1964). After a purported campaign of harassment by Davis on location in Louisiana, Crawford returned to Hollywood and entered a hospital. After a prolonged absence, during which Crawford was accused of feigning illness, Aldrich was forced to replace her with Olivia de Havilland. Crawford, who was devastated, said "I heard the news of my replacement over the radio, lying in my hospital bed ... I cried for nine hours." Crawford nursed grudges against Davis and Aldrich for the rest of her life, saying of Aldrich, "He is a man who loves evil, horrendous, vile things", to which Aldrich replied "If the shoe fits, wear it, and I am very fond of Miss Crawford". Despite being replaced, brief footage of Crawford made it into the film when she is seen sitting in a taxi in a wide shot.

In 1965, she played Amy Nelson in I Saw What You Did, another William Castle vehicle. She starred as Monica Rivers in Herman Cohen's horror thriller film Berserk! (1967). After the film's release, Crawford guest-starred as herself on The Lucy Show. The episode, "Lucy and the Lost Star", first aired on February 26, 1968. Crawford struggled during rehearsals, and drank heavily on-set, leading series star Lucille Ball to suggest replacing her with Gloria Swanson. However, Crawford was letter-perfect the day of the show, which included dancing the Charleston, and received two standing ovations from the studio audience.

In October 1968, Crawford's 29-year-old daughter, Christina (who was then acting in New York on the soap opera The Secret Storm), needed immediate medical attention for a ruptured ovarian tumor. Despite the fact that Christina's character was a 28-year-old and Crawford was in her sixties, Crawford offered to play her role until Christina was well enough to return, to which producer Gloria Monty readily agreed.

Crawford's appearance in the 1969 television film Night Gallery (which served as pilot to the series that followed) marked Steven Spielberg's first time directing a professional actor. Crawford made a cameo appearance as herself in the first episode of The Tim Conway Show, which aired on January 30, 1970. She starred on the big screen one final time, playing Dr. Brockton in Herman Cohen's science fiction horror film Trog (1970), rounding out a career spanning 45 years and more than 80 motion pictures. Crawford made three more television appearances, including one as Stephanie White in a 1970 episode ("The Nightmare") of The Virginian and as Joan Fairchild (her final dramatic performance) in a 1972 episode ("Dear Joan: We're Going to Scare You to Death") of The Sixth Sense.

Final years
On February 2, 1970, Crawford was presented with the Cecil B. DeMille Award by John Wayne at the Golden Globes, which was telecast from the Coconut Grove at The Ambassador Hotel in Los Angeles. In 1970, she also spoke at Stephens College in Columbia, Missouri, where she had been a student for two months in 1922.

Crawford published her autobiography, A Portrait of Joan, co-written with Jane Kesner Ardmore, in 1962 through Doubleday. Crawford's next book, My Way of Life, was published in 1971 by Simon & Schuster. Those expecting a racy tell-all were disappointed, although Crawford's meticulous ways were revealed in her advice on grooming, wardrobe, exercise, and even food storage.

Joan Crawford's last official public appearance was on April 8, 1973 at Town Hall in Manhattan, New York. Crawford appeared as the fourth legend in John Springer's "Legendary Ladies" series. The event was sold out, with the 1,500 seat venue filled to capacity. The audience watched a series of highlight scenes from Crawford's screen career. Afterward, Crawford came on stage for a question and answer session with the audience. Upon Crawford's departure, approximately 200 fans surrounded her limousine and would not let it move for several minutes.

In September 1973, Crawford moved from apartment 22-G to a smaller apartment next door, 22-H, at the Imperial House, 150 East 69th Street, New York. Her last public appearance was made on September 23, 1974, at a book party co-hosted with her old friend Rosalind Russell at New York's Rainbow Room. Russell was suffering from breast cancer and arthritis at the time. When Crawford saw the unflattering photos that appeared in the papers the next day, she said "If that's how I look, then they won't see me anymore."

Death and legacy
Crawford had a heart attack on May 10, 1977, and died in her apartment in Lenox Hill, New York City. Her age was reported as 69.

On May 6, 1977, Crawford had given away her Shih Tzu, Princess Lotus Blossom, because she was too weak to continue to care for her. A funeral was held at Campbell Funeral Home, New York, on May 13, 1977. In her will, which was signed on October 28, 1976, Crawford bequeathed to her two youngest children, Cindy and Cathy, $77,500 each from her $2 million estate.

She explicitly disinherited the two eldest, Christina and Christopher: "It is my intention to make no provision herein for my son, Christopher, or my daughter, Christina, for reasons which are well known to them." Both of them challenged the will and received a $55,000 settlement. She also bequeathed nothing to her niece, Joan Lowe (1933–1999; born Joan Crawford LeSueur, the only child of her estranged brother, Hal). Crawford left money to her favorite charities: the USO of New York, the Motion Picture & Television Country House and Hospital, the American Cancer Society, the Muscular Dystrophy Association, the American Heart Association, and the Wiltwyck School for Boys. During World War II, she was a member of American Women's Voluntary Services.

A memorial service was held for Crawford at All Souls' Unitarian Church on Lexington Avenue in New York on May 16, 1977. In attendance were long-time friend Myrna Loy and co-stars Geraldine Brooks and Cliff Robertson, who gave eulogies; Pearl Bailey sang "He'll Understand". Another memorial service, organized by George Cukor, was held on June 24 in the Samuel Goldwyn Theater at the Academy of Motion Picture Arts and Sciences in Beverly Hills, California. Crawford was cremated, and her ashes placed in a crypt with her fourth and final husband, Alfred Steele, in Ferncliff Cemetery, Hartsdale, New York.

Joan Crawford's hand prints and footprints appear in the forecourt of Grauman's Chinese Theatre in Hollywood. She has a star on the Hollywood Walk of Fame, at 1752 Vine Street, for her contributions to the motion picture industry. Playboy listed Crawford as #84 of the "100 Sexiest Women of the 20th century". In 1999, Crawford was also voted the tenth-greatest female star of the classic American cinema by the American Film Institute.

Crawford has also attracted a following in the gay community. In Joan Crawford: The Essential Biography, the author wrote that Crawford appealed to many gay men because they sympathized with her struggle for success in both the entertainment industry and her personal life.

Mommie Dearest

In November 1978, Christina Crawford published Mommie Dearest, which contained allegations that her late adoptive mother was emotionally and physically abusive to Christina and her brother Christopher because she chose fame and her career over parenthood.

Many of Crawford's friends and co-workers, including Van Johnson, Ann Blyth, Myrna Loy, Katharine Hepburn, Cesar Romero, Gary Gray, Douglas Fairbanks Jr. (Crawford's first husband), and Crawford's two other younger daughters, Cathy and Cindy, denounced the book, categorically denying any abuse. Others including Helen Hayes, June Allyson, and Vincent Sherman stated they had witnessed strict discipline. For example, Hayes and Sherman both stated in their autobiographies that they felt Joan was too strict a parent. Allyson stated in her autobiography that she witnessed Joan put Christina in "time-out", and did not let her go to a friend's birthday party as a punishment. However these people never stated they witnessed any outright abuse.

Mommie Dearest became a best-seller, and was made into the 1981 film Mommie Dearest, starring Faye Dunaway as Crawford.

On July 20, 1998, one of Joan Crawford's other adopted children, Cathy Crawford LaLonde, filed a lawsuit against Christina Crawford for "defamation of character". LaLonde stated in her lawsuit that during the 20th-anniversary book tour of Mommie Dearest, Christina publicly claimed to interviewers that LaLonde and her twin sister, Cynthia, were not biological sisters, and that their adoption was never legal. LaLonde stated neither claim by Christina was true, and attached copies of the twin girls' birth certificates and adoption documentation to the lawsuit. The lawsuit was later settled out of court for $5,000 plus court costs.

In popular culture
Pictures of Crawford were used in the album artwork of The Rolling Stones' album Exile on Main St. (1972).

Four years after her death, Blue Öyster Cult released the song "Joan Crawford" as part of their album Fire of Unknown Origin (1981).

Crawford was portrayed by actress Barrie Youngfellow in the 1980 film The Scarlett O'Hara War.

The alleged feud between Crawford and Bette Davis is depicted in the 1989 book Bette and Joan: The Divine Feud. It was fueled by competition over film roles, Academy Awards, and Franchot Tone (Joan Crawford's second husband), who was Davis's co-star in 1935's Dangerous.

The Crawford-Davis rivalry was the subject of the 2017 television series Feud: Bette and Joan, with Jessica Lange as Crawford and Susan Sarandon as Davis. Olivia de Havilland, also depicted in the series, filed charges to prevent its broadcast.

Filmography and awards

Autobiographies

Notes

References

Bibliography

Sources

 Considine, Shaun (1989). Bette and Joan: The Divine Feud. New York, E. P. Dutton, a division of Penguin Books. .
 Bret, David (2006).  Joan Crawford: Hollywood Martyr. Robson. .
 Granlund, Nils T. (1957). Blondes, Brunettes, and Bullets. New York, David McKay Company.
 Hoefling, Larry J. (2008). Nils Thor Granlund: The Swedish Showman Who Invented American Entertainment. Inlandia Press. .
 LaSalle, Mick (2000). Complicated Women: Sex and Power in Pre-Code Hollywood. New York, Thomas Dunne Books, an imprint of St. Martin's Press. .
 Dunaway, Faye (1998). Looking For Gatsby. Pocket. .
 Leese, Elizabeth (1991). Costume Design in the Movies. Dover Books. .
 Newquist, Roy, with introduction by John Springer (1980). Conversations with Joan Crawford. New Jersey, Citadel Press, a division of Lyle Stuart, Inc. .
 Quirk, Lawrence J. and William Schoell. (2002). Joan Crawford: the essential biography. University Press of Kentucky. .
 Skal, David J. (1993). The Monster Show: A Cultural History of Horror. Penguin Books. .
 Thomas, Bob (1978). Joan Crawford: A Biography. New York, Bantam Books. .

Further reading

External links
 Official Website

 
 
 
 
 Excerpt of March 2008 biography, VanityFair.com
 
 Joan Crawford profile, Virtual-History.com
 Joan Crawford awards at Brandeis University

 
1900s births
1977 deaths
20th-century American actresses
20th-century American businesspeople
20th-century American businesswomen
20th-century American memoirists
20th-century American women writers
Actresses from Kansas City, Missouri
Actresses from Oklahoma
Actresses from San Antonio
Age controversies
American Christian Scientists
American corporate directors
American drink industry businesspeople
American female dancers
American film actresses
American people of English descent
American people of French descent
American people of Irish descent
American people of Swedish descent
American radio actresses
American silent film actresses
American swing dancers
American television actresses
American women business executives
American women memoirists
Best Actress Academy Award winners
Burials at Ferncliff Cemetery
California Democrats
Cecil B. DeMille Award Golden Globe winners
Converts to Christian Science
Dancers from Missouri
Metro-Goldwyn-Mayer contract players
Missouri Democrats
New York (state) Democrats
PepsiCo people
Texas Democrats
WAMPAS Baby Stars
Warner Bros. contract players